Park Hill, Parkhill, or Park Hills may refer to:

People 
Allan Parkhill (1912–1986), New Zealand rugby player
Archdale Parkhill (1878–1947), Australian politician
Barry Parkhill (b. 1951), American basketball player
Bruce Parkhill (b. 1949), American basketball player
Charles B. Parkhill (1859–1933), Justice of the Florida Supreme Court
Douglas Parkhill, Canadian technologist and former research minister
John Parkhill (disambiguation), several people
Julian Parkhill (b. 1964), British microbiologist
Lee Parkhill (b. 1988), Canadian sailor

Places

United Kingdom
Park Hill, Sheffield, a listed housing estate in Sheffield, England
Park Hill Recreation Ground, a park in London Borough of Croydon, England

Canada
Parkhill, Ontario, a community in  Middlesex County, Ontario, Canada.
Parkhill/Stanley Park, Calgary, a neighbourhood in Calgary, Alberta

United States – settlements
Park Hill, Arkansas, in Pulaski County, Arkansas
Park Hill, Denver, a neighborhood in Denver, Colorado, listed on the National Register of Historic Places (NRHP)
Park Hill, Louisville, a neighborhood in Louisville, Kentucky
Parkhill, Pennsylvania, a community in Cambria County, Pennsylvania. 
Park Hill, Oklahoma
Park Hill, Yonkers, a neighborhood in Yonkers, New York
Park Hill (Lincoln, Nebraska), listed on the NRHP in Lancaster County
Park Hill Historic District, North Little Rock, Arkansas, listed on the NRHP in Pulaski County
Park Hill (Paris, Arkansas), listed on the NRHP in Logan County
Park Hill School District, Missouri, in the Kansas City metropolitan area
Clifton, Staten Island, New York, a section of which is called Park Hill

United States – geographic features
Park Hills, Kentucky
Park Hills, Missouri
Park Hills (Montana), a mountain range in Montana
Park Hill (Oneida County, New York), an elevation in Oneida County, New York

Companies and organizations
Park Hill Group, part of the PJT Partners investment bank